The Thermopolis Shale is a geologic formation which formed in west-central North America in the Albian age of the Late Cretaceous period. Surface outcroppings occur in central Canada, and the U.S. states of Montana and Wyoming. The rock formation was laid down over about 7 million years by sediment flowing into the Western Interior Seaway. The formation's boundaries and members are not well-defined by geologists, which has led to different definitions of the formation. Some geologists conclude the formation should not have a designation independent of the formations above and below it. A range of invertebrate and small and large vertebrate fossils and coprolites are found in the formation.

Geological history
The Western Interior Seaway was an inland sea that existed from the Late Jurassic (161.2 ± 4.0 to 145.5 ± 4.0 million years ago [Ma]) to the end of the Paleogene (66 to 23.03 Ma). It existed in the middle of North America, extending from the Arctic Ocean to the Gulf of Mexico.

A foreland basin existed just to the east of the Sevier orogenic belt, which was inundated by the Western Interior Seaway. A forearc on the western side of the basin made this deeper than the eastern side, encouraging the build-up of sediment and, in time, sedimentary rock. Erosion of the Western Cordillera also contributed to the build-up of sedimentary rock on the western edge of the basin, while the more low-lying area to the east provided much less. Changes in the amount, type, rate, and other aspects of the sedimentation were caused by uplift, subsidence, sea level changes, and other factors. The water in the basin made at least two major advances and one major retreat during the Cretaceous, adding complexity to the rock and permitting the creation of riverine, marsh, and estuarine rock in addition to the principal shallow and deep marine rock.

Dating of bentonite and palynological evidence indicate that the Lower Thermopolis Member was deposited between 100.3 and 98.5 Ma. A study of Inoceramidae bivalves confirmed a Late Albian age. Deposition of the upper three members of the Thermopolis Shale occurred over approximately 7 million years.

Identification
The Thermopolis Shale was first identified in 1914 by geologist Ferdinand F. Hintze, Jr. He called it the "Lower Benton Shale", and included the Mowry Shale in the same formation. (The fourth member of the "Lower Benton Shale" was the Mowry Shale.)

The Thermopolis Shale was first named by geologist Charles T. Lupton in 1916. Lupton described the rocks as a formation lying conformably atop the Cloverly Formation, and conformably underlying the Mowry Shale. The Thermopolis Shale was the basal of four formations making up the Colorado Group. No type locality was identified, but the formation was named for the town of Thermopolis in Hot Springs County, Wyoming—where, nearby, outcroppings of the shale were well exposed. Lupton's division of the Thermopolis Shale was adopted by the United States Geological Survey and used for the next 50 years.

The stratigraphic history of the Thermopolis Shale was first outlined by geologist Don L. Eicher in 1962.

About the formation
The Thermopolis Shale belongs to both the Colorado Group and Dakota Formation. Both historically and currently, the stratigraphic units in these groups, and in the Thermopolis Shale, have been unclear, and the nomenclature used by geologists is not standardized. The identification of beds, members, and formations and their names have changed over time as well.

The Thermopolis Shale is said by Eicher to overlie the Cloverly Formation, although Rice, Porter et al., and Lash that in Montana and Wyoming the Kootenai Formation is geologically equivalent to the Cloverly Formation and thus conclude that the Thermopolis Shale overlies the Kootenai Formation.  There is disagreement as to the stratigraphic definition of the basal member of the Thermopolis Shale, however. Eicher has argued that the "rusty beds" division is clearly distinguishable in many ways from the Cloverly Formation, and thus belongs to the Thermopolis Shale. Seeland and Brauch assigned the "rusty beds" to the Cloverly Formation in 1975, an assessment concurred with by Finn in 2010. Porter et al., however, classified the "rusty beds" as part of the Fall River Sandstone in 1997.

What constitutes the upper boundary of the Thermopolis Shale is disputed, making it difficult to identify what overlays the Thermopolis Shale. In 1922, Collier identified the beds below the Mowry Shale as the Nefsy shale member of the Graneros Shale. This left the Thermopolis Shale underlying the Graneros Shale. But Rubey assigned these rocks to the Mowry Shale in 1931, so that now the Thermopolis Shale underlay the Mowry Shale. Eicher redefined these beds in 1960 as the Shell Creek Shale, separating them from the Mowry Shale. This effectively put the Thermopolis Shale below the Muddy Sandstone Formation. In 1998, Porter et al. identified the Shell Creek Shale as the upper member of the Thermopolis Shale, a position with which Lash agreed in 2011.

Depending on the definition of the shale, and the location, the Thermopolis Shale varies widely in thickness.

Generally speaking, the Thermopolis Shale consists of a dark gray to black shale, with thin layers of bentonite, sandy claystone, and siltstone interspersed throughout the shale. Depending on the stratigraphic definition of the formation, a gray, thinly-bedded sandstone member exists between the upper and lower members.

Members
For the purposes of this article, the definition of the Thermopolis Shale used by Porter et al.  and Lash will be used, recognizing (as Condon does) that there is scientific disagreement about this issue. Using this definition, there are four members of the Thermopolis Shale:

The "rusty beds" Member—This basal member of the Thermopolis Shale was first described by Nelson H. Darton in 1904, who noted the sandy nature of this shale and its rusty brown color. The color was attributed to the presence of iron, and Darton coined the term "rusty series" in 1906. The first geologist to use the term "rusty beds", however, was Chester W. Washburne in 1908. These rocks were laid down as the level of the Western Interior Seaway began a major rise. Erosion of the lacustrine Kootenai Formation occurred, creating a nonconformity as the new "rusty beds" rock was laid down. In some places, the entire upper Himes Member of the Cloverly Formation had eroded, allowing the "rusty beds" to lie disconformably on the medial Little Sheep Member. The basal beds of the "rusty beds" are probably estuarine or deltaic in nature. The "rusty beds" member is geologically equivalent to the Fall River Sandstone, Greybull Sandstone, and some members of the Dakota Formation.
Lower Thermopolis Member—This member of the Thermopolis Shale was first briefly described by Darton in 1904, and more completely by Washburne in 1908. The member has remained unnamed or only informally named, usually being only referred to as the Lower Thermopolis Member. These rocks were deposited as the northern and southern portions of the Western Interior seaway linked together, and represents deposition during the maximum "transgression" (rise in sea level) of the Western Interior Seaway. The transition from the "rusty beds" to the Lower Thermopolis Member is gradational, probably due to erosion or flooding. The Lower Thermopolis Member was described by Washburne and Harshman as carbon-rich black shale with occasional sandstone lenses in its lower portion, and E.N. Harshman noted it was fissile. Porter et al., however, described the rock in 1993 as mudstone or siltstone, implying a lack of fissility. The Lower Thermopolis Member is geologically equivalent to the Skull Creek Shale.

Muddy Sandstone Member—This member of the Thermopolis Shale was first briefly described by Darton in 1904, and much more completely by Hintze in 1914. Hintze called this member the "Muddy sand", after the terminology used by oil and gas drillers in Wyoming. It remained informally known as the "Muddy sand" into the 1960s, despite widespread acknowledgement among geologists that it was significant and widely occurring and worthy of a formal name. By 1972, the member had received the formal name "Muddy Sandstone Member". The Muddy Sandstone began to be laid down during a period when water levels in the Western Interior Seaway dropped, and this deposition continued once sea levels rose again. An erosional unconformity occurred while the sea receded, over which estuarine and fluvial deposits were laid down as the Muddy Sandstone. Thus, in some areas contact with the overlying Muddy Sandstone is sharp and unconformable, while in others it is conformable and gradational. Deposition of the Muddy Sandstone continued around the foreland basin's margins, while the Upper Thermopolis Member was laid down conformably above the Muddy Sandstone in the basin's interior. The Muddy Sandstone consists of a number of thin beds of fine-grained, silty sandstone of buff, brownish-grey, or grey color. It is shaly, contains carbon flecks and pyrite crystals, and when weathered is either buff or grey. Some beds exhibit ripple marks. The sandstone is interbedded with thin beds of shale, siltstone, and (occasionally) bentonite. David Seeland and Early Brauch have concluded that is because pre-Laramide geologic structures or topography probably governed the distribution of Muddy Sandstone deposits. The Muddy Sandstone Member is geologically equivalent to the Birdhead Sandstone.
Upper Thermopolis Member—This member of the Thermopolis Shale was first briefly described by Darton in 1904, and more completely by Washburne in 1908. Norman Mills was the first to use the term "Upper Thermopolis" in 1956, although the member remained formally unnamed. The Upper Thermopolis Member was laid down conformably atop the Muddy Sandstone in the foreland basin's interior during the latter part of the Western Interior Seaway's second transgression. Washburne described the member as consisting of bluish-black shale, interbedded very occasionally with beds of volcanic ash and bentonite in the upper part. Harshman has provided evidence that the upper beds are a transitional zone leading to the Mowry Shale. He observed that the upper beds consist primarily of thin, limy, silty sandstone and silty shale beds interbedded with dense, siliceous Mowry Shale with the occasional bed of silty lignite. The sandstone beds exhibit mud cracks and root tubes which indicate a paludal (marsh deposited) origin. The differences between the upper and lower beds led Harshman to conclude that some of the sandier beds near the base of the Upper Thermopolis Member may belong to the Muddy Sandstone Member. Seeland and Brauch also found extensive evidence of gradational contact with the overlying Mowry Shale. The Muddy Sandstone Member is geologically equivalent to the Shell Creek Shale.

Surface outcroppings of the Thermopolis Shale occur in central Canada, and the U.S. states of Montana and Wyoming. Marine-deposited rock thins toward the west, while nonmarine-deposited rock thins toward the east. The marine-deposited rock is primarily shale, with some limestone, sandstone, and siltstone. The nonmarine rock is primarily sandstone, with some coal, shale, "black" or carbonaceous shale, and siltstone.

Fossil record
The Thermopolis Shale is unusually rich in marine vertebrate fossils, consisting primarily of skeletal material, teeth, and coprolites.

A particularly rich marine vertebrate fossil zone exists in the lower beds of the Upper Thermopolis Member. Marine crocodile, plesiosaur (primarily Edgarosaurus muddi), ray (primarily Pseudohypolophus and an unidentified species), sawfish (primarily Onchopristis), and turtle (primarily Baenidae and Glyptops) remains, as well as whole coprolites, are abundant. Hybodont shark (primarily Meristodonoides), ganoid-scaled and teleost fish, and invertebrate fossil ammonoids (primarily Baculites) are also found.

See also

 List of fossiliferous stratigraphic units in Montana
 Paleontology in Montana

References
Notes

Citations

Bibliography

Shale formations of the United States
Cretaceous Montana